The 92nd Indianapolis 500 was held at the Indianapolis Motor Speedway in Speedway, Indiana on Sunday May 25, 2008. Scott Dixon of New Zealand won the race from the pole position.

It was the thirteenth Indy 500 sanctioned by the Indy Racing League, and served as the showcase event of the 2008 IndyCar Series in DIRECTV HD season. It was the fifth round of the 2008 IndyCar Series season. It was the first Indy 500 after the open wheel "unification" took place, and it featured a full complement of entries of IndyCar Series regulars, as well as former Champ Car teams.

It was the first Indy 500 where all entries utilized the Dallara IR-05 chassis after Phil Giebler failed to qualify with Panoz chassis - effectively ushering in a four-year "spec" era. In addition, all full-time entries began utilizing semi-automatic paddle shifters in 2008. Paddle shifters for part-time Indy 500-only entries were optional due to cost reasons.
IndyCar Series practice began May 4. Time trials took place over the two weekends prior to the race (May 10–11 and May 17–18). The final practice was held Friday May 23.

Schedule

Other selected events
May 22: Firestone Indy Lights practice and qualifying
May 23/24: Firestone Freedom 100

News

 The purse for the 2008 Indy 500 was increased substantially from previous records. Under a new league revenue sharing program, the winner of the 2008 Indy 500 received an estimated US$2.5 million, while the entire race purse totaled at least US$13.4 million.
 Two-time Indianapolis 500 and Formula One champion Emerson Fittipaldi drove the Chevrolet Corvette pace car.
 2007 IndyCar rookie of the year Ryan Hunter-Reay was eligible to compete for the Rookie of the Year award, under race rules. Even though he is an established IndyCar driver, he has not yet made a start at Indianapolis. Several other former Champ Car drivers will be individually evaluated and may be eligible to require only a "refresher" level test in lieu of the traditional four-phase rookie test.  Any driver not declared a rookie, but had not started this race in the past, in the series were declared rookies for this race only.
 With the IRL/CC merger, the 2008 running was expected to be one of the most competitive in many years.
 Peak motor oil sponsored the US$100,000 pole position award.
 The official entry list was released April 11. The initial list featured 39 cars and 32 drivers. Additional drivers were announced during practice and qualifying.
 2006 MotoGP World Champion Nicky Hayden, rode around the oval track approximately one hour prior to the 500 start aboard a Honda RC212V Grand Prix motorcycle, demonstrating the 2-wheel machinery that will be racing at Indianapolis in September.
 On May 19, the 33 qualified drivers took part in a media tour in New York City. The drivers lined up in the traditional eleven rows of three in front of the famous Charging Bull near Wall Street.
 On May 21, 2008, it was announced Kristi Yamaguchi will be the starter for the race. A death in the family forced Floyd Mayweather Jr. to withdraw from the honorary position.

Entertainment
Julianne Hough, who partnered with two-time Indy 500 winner Hélio Castroneves to win Dancing with the Stars, sang the national anthem. Jim Nabors returned to sing "Back Home Again in Indiana" after an illness prevented him from doing so in 2007. 1992 Winter Olympics women's figure skating gold medalist Kristi Yamaguchi, the season six winner of Dancing with the Stars, served as the honorary starter and wave the green flag.

Stone Temple Pilots performed during the annual Carb Day Concert. Other bands performing during the month included Healing Sixes, DJ Orion, Chevelle, Ludo, Yellowcard, The Bravery, Psychodots, Forever the Sickest Kids, OK Go, Sum 41, Jon McLaughlin, and Jack's Mannequin.

Entry list

Practice (week 1)

Sunday May 4, 2008 - Rookie Orientation and Veteran Refreshers
 Weather: Sunny, blue skies, 
 Practice summary: Indianapolis Star Opening Day presents the Unsers started on-track activities for the month. The first day of rookie orientation opened with thirteen drivers eligible to participate. Each first-time starter must pass a four-phase rookie test before being allowed to practice with veterans and qualify. Graham Rahal, Oriol Servià, Ryan Hunter-Reay, Alex Lloyd, Hideki Mutoh, Will Power, Justin Wilson, Jaime Camara, E. J. Viso, and Jay Howard  passed all four phases of the rookie test. Veteran Max Papis took part in a refresher test. Enrique Bernoldi completed 3 phases of his rookie test and Mario Moraes took to the track at the end of the day to shake his car down. The thirteen drivers turned 661 laps without incident.

Monday May 5, 2008 - Rookie Orientation and Veteran Refreshers
 Weather: Sunny, 
 Practice summary: The second day of orientation saw more cars on track and a significant increase in speeds. Enrique Bernoldi completed the fourth and final phase of his rookie test, bringing the total to 11 drivers who have done so. Davey Hamilton and Bruno Junqueira returned to the cockpit for a refresher session. Around 1 p.m., Jamie Camara did a half spin and crashed in turn one. Mario Domínguez and Mario Moraes completed the first three phases of their rookie tests and will be allowed to complete the fourth phase during open practice. The sixteen cars on the track turned 655 laps.

Tuesday May 6, 2008 - IndyCar Series practice
 Weather: Mostly cloudy, 
 Practice summary: The first day of veteran practice saw 33 car/driver combinations take to the Speedway. AGR teammates Marco Andretti and Tony Kanaan led the speed charts, with Ganassi and Penske entries also filling out the top ten. 2004 winner Buddy Rice put the Dreyer & Reinbold team back near the top of the speed chart for the first time in several years. No major incidents occurred. Early in the afternoon, Graham Rahal slid loose in the southchute, but maintained control and did not hit the wall. With rain in the forecast over the next two days, the participants logged 1,385 laps. Senator Hillary Clinton, in the Indianapolis area campaigning for the Indiana primary, visited the track as a guest of Sarah Fisher. Fisher went on to take her first laps on the track in the final hour of the session.

Wednesday May 7, 2008 - IndyCar Series practice
 Weather: Rain, windy, 
 Practice summary: Practice was scheduled to begin at 12:00 p.m., but rain delayed the start. Twice the track was nearly dry and preparing to open, but both times rain returned. At 3:20 p.m., the track was closed for the day.

Thursday May 8, 2008 - IndyCar Series practice
 Weather: Rain, windy, 
 Practice summary: The rain from the previous day continued through the night and the day's on-track activities were canceled at approximately 1:45 p.m., when it was clear that the rain would not cease and the track could not be dried.

Friday May 9, 2008 - IndyCar Series Fast Friday practice
 Weather: Cloudy, windy, 
 Practice summary: After two days of rainouts practice resumed. Despite cool temperatures, the final day of practice before pole qualifying saw intense action. About 90 minutes into the session, Mario Domínguez spun exiting the pits, and hit the inside wall, suffering suspension damage. At 1:40 p.m., Alex Lloyd crashed hard in turn one, spinning and hitting the wall again in turn two. Around 2:00 p.m. in the pit area, Danica Patrick's car struck a member from  Mario Moraes' pit crew, Chuck Buckman, who suffered a concussion. At 3:15 p.m., the session was halted by rain, with Scott Dixon posting the fastest lap of the day to that point. At 4:00 p.m., the track was officially closed for the day.

Time trials (weekend 1)

Saturday May 10, 2008 - Pole Day time trials

 Weather: Sunny, Blue skies, 
 Practice summary
Morning practice was delayed 45 minutes due to a slightly damp track from overnight rain. All of the cars were broken into two groups for practice. Marco Andretti set the fastest lap of the first session, and the fastest lap of the month at 228.318 mph. No incidents were reported.
 Qualifications summary
Ryan Briscoe was the first driver to make an attempt, turning a speed of 224.883 mph, which suggested that speeds would be lower than those which had been achieved in the morning practice by drafting. Danica Patrick later took over the provisional pole with a run over 225 mph. Hélio Castroneves then pulled out of line in favor of going out later in the day. Spins involving A. J. Foyt IV and Bruno Junqueira did not cause any damage.

After 11 positions were filled, bumping began. Dan Wheldon took to the track, and knocked Patrick from the provisional pole. In the mid-afternoon, Hideki Mutoh failed post-qualifying inspection when it was discovered that the housing for an on-board camera lacked the required ballast, and his previous qualification was disallowed.

Around 3 p.m., Hélio Castroneves had been practicing faster than Wheldon. He went out for his first attempt, but fell short of taking over the pole position. He did not rule out another attempt later in the day. At 3:34 p.m. Ryan Briscoe became the first driver to withdraw his earlier speed, and attempt to re-qualify. He knocked Wheldon from the top spot, only to be knocked down to second moments later by Scott Dixon.

The final hour concentrated largely on teams trying to bump their way into the top 11. Hideki Mutoh was successful, but Ryan Hunter-Reay crashed hard in turn 3. Former Champ Car entries Graham Rahal, Will Power and Justin Wilson all fell short of the top 11. Meanwhile, the AGR and Penske entries gave up on their efforts to secure the pole position, and pulled their cars out of line for the day. Dan Wheldon was the final driver to withdraw his speed and make a run for the pole. After two fast laps, his second two dropped off, and he settled for second position. When the gun sounded to close the track at 6:00 p.m., Scott Dixon won his first Indianapolis 500 pole position, and Chip Ganassi Racing secured their third Indy pole.

Sunday May 11, 2008 - Second day time trials
 Weather: Rain, 
 Qualifications summary: Rain cancelled all track activity for the day. Around 12:25 p.m., with continuing rain in the forecast, the track was officially closed. Starting positions 12-33 will be filled during the third day of qualifying, Saturday May 17.

Practice (week 2)

Wednesday May 14, 2008 - IndyCar Series practice
 Weather: Fog & mist, 
 Practice summary: The start of practice was delayed 4 hours, 56 minutes due to persistent misty drizzle at the track following overnight rainstorms. In the short session, 29 drivers turned 390 laps, led by Scott Dixon at  who turned 17 laps while working with full fuel tanks on his race setup. Jeff Simmons and Roger Yasukawa turned their first laps of the month, making 16 and 15 circuits respectively.

Thursday May 15, 2008 - IndyCar Series practice
 Weather: Cloudy, 
 Practice summary: With rain in the forecast for most of the afternoon, 35 cars took to the track anxiously, completing 2,628 laps, the most of any single practice day all month. The rain, however, held off nearly all day, and began falling only 18 minutes before the track was scheduled to close. Most cars concentrated on race set-ups, while some of the non-qualified entries simulated time trial runs. No incidents were reported.

Friday May 16, 2008 - IndyCar Series practice
 Weather: Partly cloudy, 
 Practice summary: The final full day of practice saw heavy action. Pole winner Scott Dixon led the overall speed chart for the second time in two days. Of the non-qualified cars Will Power was the quickest. 1996 winner Buddy Lazier took his first laps of the month, while another second-week driver, Phil Giebler, was unable to make an on-track appearance. Three crashes, involving Ryan Briscoe, Will Power, and a less-serious one by E. J. Viso, brought the total of practice crashes to six for the month. Briscoe's crash occurred in his back-up car, while Power's must be repaired before qualifying. A total of 37 drivers and 40 cars took practice laps to date during the month.

Time trials (weekend 2)

Saturday May 17, 2008 - Third day time trials
 Weather: tba
 Practice summary
The morning practice session was marred by two crashes late in the session. Mario Dominguez wrecked in the first turn, his second crash of the month. Minutes later, Max Papis crashed hard in turn three. John Andretti led the speed chart at 224.027 mph.
 Qualifications summary
The third day of qualifications saw the field filled to 33 cars with Townsend Bell fastest of the day at 222.529 mph. Two additional crashes, along with mechanical problems, however, altered the field of non-qualified cars.

Seventeen minutes into the qualifying session, after four cars had completed runs, a light rain shower halted track activity for 15 minutes. Oriol Servia, who was on the track when the rain fell, was allowed to re-attempt without penalty. Several former Champ Car drivers including Graham Rahal, Justin Wilson, and Will Power all qualified safely.

For the second time in Indy history, three female drivers made the field, after Milka Duno and Sarah Fisher completed runs. A break in the qualifying line occurred around 2 p.m., with former champion Buddy Lazier the slowest in the field, and only one spot remaining.

Just before 4 p.m., Hideki Mutoh crashed his already-qualified car. On the exit of turn two, his car went high in the groove, and brushed along the wall part way down the backstretch. About 25 minutes later, Phil Giebler, in his first significant on-track laps, crashed hard in turn one. He was taken to Methodist Hospital.

With less than 15 minutes left in the day, A. J. Foyt IV and Marty Roth looked to make their way into the field. Foyt suffered a gearbox failure during his warm-up lap, and returned to the pits. Roth immediately went out and filled the final qualifying spot, albeit as the slowest overall in the field. Foyt's Vision crew scrambled to put the gearbox back together, in hopes of bumping into the field before the 6 o'clock gun. The team ran out of time, however, and was forced to wait until Sunday to make a qualifying attempt.

Sunday May 18, 2008 - Bump Day time trials
 Weather: tba
 Practice summary
Also spending time on the track were Marty Roth, Buddy Lazier, Mario Dominguez, and Davey Hamilton who blew a motor late in the session.
 Qualifications summary
Shortly after the track opened for time trials, A. J. Foyt IV easily bumped his way into the field, bumping Marty Roth in the process. Later in the afternoon, Roth was able to secure a spot by bumping Buddy Lazier.

After qualifying, A. J. Foyt IV took his car out for practice. The fuel buckeye cover broke off after he exited the pits, and in turn three, a fire started on the side of the car, causing him to spin and crash into the wall. The car was heavily damaged. With Roger Yasukawa on the bubble, Mario Dominguez made his first attempt to qualify, but was too slow.

In the final half hour, the unqualified cars made their final attempts. Buddy Lazier's first attempt was too slow, and his team waved off after three laps. Mario Dominguez made his second attempt, and was able to bump Roger Yasukawa from the field. Yasukawa was the next to go out, and missed bumping his way back into the field by 0.046 seconds. Max Papis lined up to make an attempt, but lingering clutch problems prevented him from pulling out of the pits. With about 13 minutes remaining, Lazier returned to the track after some adjustments, and found enough speed to bump Dominguez. Dominguez made one final attempt to make the field, taking the green flag just before the 6 o'clock gun. After one lap that was fast enough to bump Marty Roth, he lost control and crashed in turn one. Roth and Lazier held on to make the field, while Papis was left waiting in line.

Carb Day

IndyCar Series final practice - Friday May 23, 2008
 Weather: Rain, 60°
Ryan Briscoe was the only car not to take any laps, and seven drivers managed only warm-up laps. The 32nd annual McDonald's Pit Stop Challenge was to follow the final practice. However, due to the rain, the event was cancelled for the first time ever. The Firestone Freedom 100 was rescheduled for Saturday, while the Stone Temple Pilots concert went on as planned.

Starting grid

  = Former Indianapolis 500 winner
  = Indianapolis 500 rookie 

Failed to qualify

Race summary

Start

At 1:03 p.m., Mari Hulman George gave the command to start engines. All cars except Sarah Fisher pulled away, but Fisher quickly caught up to the field. Emerson Fittipaldi was booed during the parade laps due to his incident where he drank orange juice instead of milk after winning in 1993. He pulled the pace car off the track after the third pace lap, and a well-aligned field took the green flag. Polesitter Scott Dixon took the lead into turn one, and led the first two laps. His teammate Dan Wheldon took the lead on lap three. On the 8th lap, Bruno Junqueira lost a mirror, and the first of many caution periods slowed the field.

First half
Nearly the entire field pitted on the first caution, with Buddy Rice staying out to lead. Sarah Fisher also stayed out, and moved to third. Moments later, she spun in the north chute while warming her tires, and lost 3 laps. When the green resumed, Dan Wheldon quickly regained the lead. He held it until lap 36, when Dixon passed him. At the same time, rookie Graham Rahal drifted high and hit the wall exiting turn four.

Marty Roth and Jaime Camara each brought out the yellow in the first half, suffering single-car crashes. Wheldon and Dixon continued to trade the lead.

On lap 94, Tony Kanaan charged into the lead. He set a new all-time record by leading a lap in seven consecutive Indy 500 races. He broke Rick Mears' record of six straight races led (1979–1984). His continuing bad luck at Indy returned however 11 laps later. Scott Dixon took the lead back on lap 105. Marco Andretti, Kanaan's AGR teammate, dove low in turn three to overtake, which was followed by Kanaan going high and into the marbles. Kanaan lost control of his car, brushing the wall, then collecting the lapped car of Sarah Fisher. Both cars were heavily damaged. The caution was then extended when Jeff Simmons car suddenly veered and hit the inside wall on the frontstretch.

Second half
Marco Andretti gained the lead on lap 122. Dixon ran second, while Wheldon began to slip deep in the standings with handling problems. Justin Wilson brought out the yellow in turn 2 on lap 133 with yet another single-car crash. His crash was followed 20 laps later by Alex Lloyd, who brushed the wall in turn 4, and spun wildly into the pit area. Tomas Scheckter, who had been running amongst the leaders all afternoon, dropped out with a broken driveshaft.

On the lap 159 restart, Vítor Meira went three-wide and stormed into the lead. With Dixon second and Andretti third, the stage was set to decide the race between those three drivers. Other contenders, Hélio Castroneves, Ed Carpenter, Danica Patrick, Ryan Briscoe, Oriol Servia and rookie Ryan Hunter-Reay, were battling for the balance of the top ten.

Patrick/Briscoe pit incident
On lap 169, Milka Duno dove below Buddy Lazier in turn three. The two cars touched slightly, and Duno spun to the warm-up lane. She suffered a flat tire, but was able to continue. The leaders all headed to the pits on lap 171 for what would be the final sequence of pit stops. At pit exit, Ryan Briscoe swung wide and clipped the right rear of Danica Patrick's car. Patrick spun around, and Briscoe hit the pit wall. Both cars were eliminated. Patrick climbed out of the car, and started walking down towards the Team Penske pits, presumably to confront Briscoe. A security guard intervened, and she later walked back to her pit stall. Patrick and Briscoe were called to the Indycar hauler after the race. Patrick and Briscoe were fined $100,000 and were placed on probation until the end of the 2008 season for an aggressive pit incident.

Finish
With 24 laps to go, Scott Dixon led the field back to green. Vítor Meira ran second, and Marco Andretti third. The race went green the remainder of the distance, and Dixon held on by 1.7498 seconds to win his first Indianapolis 500. He became the 19th pole winner to win the race, and the first winner from New Zealand.

Full race results
All cars utilized Dallara chassis, Honda engines, and Firestone Firehawk tires.

Broadcasting

Television
The race was televised in high definition in the United States on ABC, the 44th consecutive year on that network. Time trials were shown live in high definition on ABC, ESPN, and ESPN2 at various timeslots and was available via broadband at MediaZone.com.

1998 Indianapolis 500 winner Eddie Cheever joined the announcing crew for the first time. For the first time, two hours of pre-race was aired, one hour on ESPN2, followed by one hour on ABC. For the third year in a row, the telecast utilized the Side-by-Side format for commercial breaks.

Radio
The race was broadcast on radio by the IMS Radio Network for the 56th consecutive year. Mike King served as anchor. For the second year in a row, Davey Hamilton offered live in-car reporting during caution periods. Chris Economaki offered pre-race and post-race commentary for the final time. This was also the last time that former 'voice' of the 500 Bob Jenkins served as a turn announcer.  

For the fourth year in a row, Kevin Olson conducted his annual pre-race interview with David Letterman.

Gallery

See also
 List of Indianapolis 500 winners
 Indianapolis 500 year by year
 Indy Racing League
 2008 IndyCar Series season

References

External links

 Indy500.com - Official site
 Indycar.com - Official site
 Indianapolis Star coverage

Indianapolis 500 races
Indianapolis 500
Indianapolis 500
Indianapolis 500
Indianapolis 500
Indianapolis 500
Articles containing video clips